Mohamed Refaie (born 21 February 1990) is an Egyptian footballer as a defender.

External links

Profile at Eurosport

Profile at footballdatabase.eu

1990 births
Living people
Egyptian footballers
Association football defenders
Egyptian expatriate footballers
Expatriate footballers in Belarus
Zamalek SC players
Wadi Degla SC players
FC Dnepr Mogilev players
FC Naftan Novopolotsk players
Al Masry SC players
Egyptian Premier League players
Tala'ea El Gaish SC players
Al Nasr SC (Egypt) players
Al Merreikh SC (Egypt) players